The 2012 IHF Super Globe was the sixth edition. It was held in Doha, Qatar at the Al-Gharafa Sports Club Hall from August 27 – September 1, 2012.

The teams that took part were the respective continental champions.

Atlético Madrid defeated THW Kiel in an all-European final 28–23.

Teams

Preliminary round
The draw was held on June 23, 2012. The scheduled was published on June 29, 2012.

All times are local (UTC+3)

Group A

Group B

Knockout stage

Championship bracket

Semifinals

Third place game

Final

5–8th place bracket

Semifinals

Seventh place game

Fifth place game

Final ranking

References

External links
Official website

IHF Super Globe
2012 IHF Super Globe
IHF Super Globe
International handball competitions hosted by Qatar
Sports competitions in Doha